Bezileh (also Romanized as Bezīleh) is a village in Melkari Rural District, Vazineh District, Sardasht County, West Azerbaijan Province, Iran. At the 2006 census, its population was 118, in 24 families.

References 

Populated places in Sardasht County